Long Win Bus Company Limited (LWB) is a bus company operating franchised services in Hong Kong. It provides bus service between Hong Kong International Airport, North Lantau New Town and the New Territories. It is a subsidiary of Transport International.

History
Long Win Bus started operations on 22 May 1997 to operate peak-hour services after the opening of the Tsing Ma Bridge.

The first route operated by Long Win Bus was route E31 (Tung Chung to Tsuen Wan Pier when newly introduced), served by Volvo Olympians. But later on, Volvo Olympians have been retired from the bus fleet, and were transferred to its parent company, Kowloon Motor Bus.

The company's franchise was extended from June 2003 to May 2013. In April 2012, it was extended again until May 2023. In July 2022, it was further extended for another 10 years until 30 April 2033.

Services
As of December 2017, Long Win Bus operated 30 routes which cover the Airport, Tung Chung, Hong Kong Disneyland and AsiaWorld–Expo.
The current letter assignments are in place to identify the type of bus service provided:

Prefixes
A: Airport routes. Provides deluxe bus services to and from the Hong Kong International Airport and in some cases, the Hong Kong–Zhuhai–Macau Bridge Hong Kong Port
E: External routes. Provides regular bus services serving the Airport Logistics Area and Tung Chung.
R: Routes serving Hong Kong Disneyland.
S: Shuttle routes. Provides regular bus services running between Tung Chung and the general Airport area.
N: Overnight routes. Same class as E-prefix routes
NA: Overnight airport routes: Same class as A-prefix routes

Suffixes
A: Branch of the main route (e.g., E36A)
C: Routes serving the Airport Logistics Area only, with all routes terminating at the Aircraft Maintenance Area. Same class as E-prefix routes.
P/S: Peak hour routes, although route E33P provides services beyond peak hours.

Fleet
As of December 2021, Long Win Bus operated a fleet of 257 including 252 air-conditioned low floor double-decker buses and 4 air-conditioned single-decker battery electric buses.

References

External links 

 

Bus companies of Hong Kong
Kowloon Motor Bus
Transport companies established in 1997
1997 establishments in Hong Kong
Airport bus services